Rakantrechus is a genus of beetles in the family Carabidae, containing the following species:

 Rakantrechus andoi Ueno, 1959
 Rakantrechus asonis Ueno, 1974
 Rakantrechus asthenes Ueno, 1987
 Rakantrechus constrictus Ueno, 1959
 Rakantrechus elegans Ueno, 1960
 Rakantrechus etoi Ueno, 1958
 Rakantrechus fretensis Ueno, 2008
 Rakantrechus gracillimus Ueno, 1959
 Rakantrechus kawasawai Ueno, 1951
 Rakantrechus kikuyai Ueno, 1987
 Rakantrechus kurosai Ueno, 1959
 Rakantrechus lallum Ueno, 1970
 Rakantrechus macer Ueno, 1987
 Rakantrechus mirabilis Ueno, 1958
 Rakantrechus mukaibarai Ueno, 1958
 Rakantrechus nomurai Ueno, 1960
 Rakantrechus pallescens Ueno, 1960
 Rakantrechus subglaber Ueno, 1982
 Rakantrechus taio Ueno & Sone, 2000
 Rakantrechus tenuis Ueno, 2008
 Rakantrechus tofaceus Ueno, 1970
 Rakantrechus truncaticollis Ueno, 1970
 Rakantrechus yoshikoae Ueno, 1970

References

Trechinae